Yeadon is a borough in Delaware County, Pennsylvania, United States. It borders the city of Philadelphia. The population was 11,443 at the 2010 census.

Geography
Yeadon is located in eastern Delaware County at  (39.932862, -75.251540).

History 
Yeadon and its surrounding land were once part of New Sweden. Yeadon was then known as the Swedish settlement of Mölndal (founded in 1645). The borough of Yeadon took its name from Yeadon Manor, which takes its name from Yeadon, West Yorkshire, in England.

Notable residents
 Rose Coyle, Miss America 1936; lived in Yeadon, buried in Holy Cross Cemetery
  H. H. Holmes (Herman Mudgett, 1861–1896), serial killer who is believed to have killed over 200 young women during the Chicago 1893 World's Columbian Exposition; buried in Holy Cross Cemetery
 John McDermott, first U.S.-born golfer to win the U.S. Open; lived in Yeadon, buried in Holy Cross Cemetery
 Betsy Ross, who according to legend sewed the first flag of the United States. Betsy Ross never actually lived in Yeadon, but was for some time buried there, in Mount Moriah Cemetery, before being exhumed to be re-buried in the city of Philadelphia.
 Tony Taylor, second baseman for the Philadelphia Phillies in 1960s and 1970s
 Frank Tinney, Philadelphia-born vaudeville comedian buried in Holy Cross Cemetery
 George Ronald Christmas, Marine officer and Navy Cross / Purple Heart winner during Vietnam War at Battle of Hue. Spent over 30 years in Marines , retiring as a Lt General.

Education
William Penn School District serves Yeadon.
 Bell Avenue Elementary School (K-6)
 Evans Elementary School (K-6)
 Penn Wood Middle School (7-8) (Darby)
 Penn Wood High School, Cypress Street Campus (9)
 Penn Wood High School, Green Ave Campus  (10-12) (Lansdowne)

Religion
The Roman Catholic Archdiocese of Philadelphia operates Catholic churches. In October 1928 St. Louis Church in Yeadon opened. Circa 2008 1,267 families were registered with the church. In 2013 St. Louis merged into Blessed Virgin Mary Church in Darby, with the St. Louis parish closed.

Demographics

As of Census 2010, the racial makeup of the borough was 7.5% White, 88.6% African American, 0.2% Native American, 0.8% Asian, 0.1% Native Hawaiian and Pacific Islander, 0.6% from other races, and 2.1% from two or more races. Hispanic or Latino of any race were 1.9% of the population.

As of the census of 2000, there were 11,762 people, 4,696 households, and 2,967 families residing in the borough. The population density was 7,297.1 people per square mile (2,820.7/km2). There were 4,958 housing units at an average density of 3,075.9 per square mile (1,189.0/km2). The racial makeup of the borough was 79.77% African American, 15.56% White, 0.21% Native American, 0.89% Asian, 0.01% Pacific Islander, 0.41% from other races, and 2.15% from two or more races. Hispanic or Latino of any race were 1.02% of the population.

There were 4,696 households, of which 31.2% had children under the age of 18 living with them, 37.6% were married couples living together, 20.0% had a female householder with no husband present, and 36.8% were non-families. 32.2% of all households were made up of individuals, and 10.9% had someone living alone who was 65 years of age or older. The average household size was 2.43 and the average family size was 3.09.

In the borough, the population was spread out in age, with 24.5% under 18, 7.7% from 18 to 24, 29.8% from 25 to 44, 22.7% from 45 to 64, and 15.4% who were 65 or older. The median age was 38 years. For every 100 females there were 79.7 males. For every 100 females age 18 and over, there were 74.1 males.

The median income for a household in the borough was $45,550, and the median income for a family was $55,169. Males had a median income of $39,830 versus $35,118 for females. The per capita income for the borough was $22,546. About 12.5% of families and 14.6% of the population were below the poverty line, including 5.1% of those under age 18 and 6.7% of those age 65 or over.

Transportation

U.S. Route 13 is the only numbered highway serving Yeadon. It follows a generally southwest-to-northeast alignment through the borough utilizing MacDade Boulevard, Church Lane and Baltimore Avenue.

References

External links

Borough of Yeadon official website
Yeadon Public Library

Boroughs in Delaware County, Pennsylvania
Populated places established in 1893